Megachile funnelli is a species of bee in the family Megachilidae. It was described by Theodore Dru Alison Cockerell in 1907.

References

Funnelli
Insects described in 1907